Don Perrin (born 1 October 1964) is a Canadian writer and former military officer.

Early life and education
Born in Iserlohn, Germany, Perrin grew up in Kingston, ON, Canada, McMasterville, QC, Canada, Bromley, Kent, England, and Ottawa, ON, Canada. Perrin served in the Canadian Corps of Electrical and Mechanical Engineers, in the Canadian Department of National Defence. He holds a Bachelor of Science in Mathematics and Physics from the Royal Military College of Canada in 1987.

Career
Don Perrin was Vice President of Operations with Mag Force 7, Inc. He wrote a series of novels in the Mag Force 7 series, with the first hitting the shelf in April 1995. He has three successful collectible game designs to his credit with Star of the Guardians Collectible Trading Card Game and Wing Commander Collectible Trading Card Game, and the Star Trek: the Card Game. Perrin has also designed role playing products for Imperium Games's Traveller RPG Universe. For Imperium's fourth edition of Traveller (also called Marc Miller's Traveller or T4) published in 1996, the designers worked on distinct parts of the rules, with Perrin writing about starships. Perrin then worked on the game Zero (1997) for Archangel Entertainment. Perrin is also a contributor to the Dragonlance novel series.

Perrin and Lester Smith designed the Sovereign Stone RPG (1998) based on the trilogy of Sovereign Stone books, and Margaret Weis formed the company Sovereign Press with herself as CEO to publish the RPG. On April 17, 2001, Perrin announced that Sovereign Press was replacing its original Sovereign Stone game system with a new d20-based line. To support the setting, Weis and Perrin wrote a short story called "Shadamehr and the Old Wives Tale" which appeared in Dragon #264 (October, 1999). In 2002 Wizards of the Coast agreed to license the Dragonlance setting to Sovereign Press for RPG publication; Weis and Perrin, along with Jamie Chambers and Christopher Coyle, wrote the Dragonlance Campaign Setting (2003) for publication by Wizards of the Coast, after which Sovereign Press was allowed to expand and supplement that book using the d20 licence. In 2004, Perrin left Sovereign Press and Weis founded the new company Margaret Weis Productions.

Perrin acted as an advisor for Margaret Weis on the final Star of the Guardians novel, Ghost Legion (in which he also appears as a character). The couple co-authored the Mag Force 7 novels.

Don Perrin, Michael Cosentino and Kathyrn Plamback purchased the two US wargaming magazines, "The Courier" and "MWAN" and combined them into the Historical Miniature Gamer Magazine in 2005. This magazine won the Nonfiction Publication of the Year Award at the 32nd Annual Origins Awards. The magazine offered articles on wargaming/wargames (of widely varied periods), tips on painting, building hints, scenarios, reviews of wargaming books, rules, miniatures and a monthly column by Howard Whitehouse. In 2007 James Manto was brought in as editor-in-chief to help with the organization and structure of the articles. Taking advantage of Perrin's QPOD (Quality Printing on Demand) in-house printing (where small numbers of books, rules, supplements can be printed inexpensively) the magazine underwent a complete overhaul to an easy to hold quarterly magazine. The magazine was closed in 2008.

Personal life
Perrin was married to Margaret Weis, though they are now divorced.

Perrin married Kathryn Plamback in Las Vegas, Nevada in 2016.

He lives in Las Vegas, Nevada.

Bibliography

Mag Force 7 series
 The Knights of the Black Earth (1995), 
 Robot Blues (1996), 
 Hung Out (1998),

Dragonlance universe
 Theros Ironfeld (1996), 
 The Doom Brigade (1996), 
 Brothers in Arms (1999), 
 Draconian Measures (2000), 
 Bertrem's Guide to the War of Souls Volume Two (1 November 2002), Wizards of the Coast, with Steven T. Brown and Mary H. Herbert

Warcraft universe
 Lord of the Clans (1 October 2001), 

Short works
 "First Dragon Army Bridge Building Company" (in Dragons of Krynn)
 "Island of the Brutes" (in The History of Dragonlance)
 "War Diary of Lord Ariaken" (in Dragons of Summer Flame)

Tabletop RPG books
 Dragonlance Campaign Setting (1 August 2003), Wizards of the Coast, 
 Starships: Traveller (1996), Imperium Games, 
 Sovereign Stone Game System'' (July 2000), Sovereign Press, with Lester Smith

References

External links
 

DonPerrin.com

1964 births
20th-century Canadian novelists
21st-century Canadian novelists
Canadian fantasy writers
Canadian male novelists
Living people
People from Beloit, Wisconsin
Role-playing game designers
Royal Military College of Canada alumni
Writers from Wisconsin